ClassiKhan is the tenth studio album by American R&B/funk singer Chaka Khan, featuring the London Symphony Orchestra, Produced and arranged by Eve Nelson and released in 2004 on the at the time still independent label Sanctuary Records in the U.K., on Earthsong/AgU Music Group in the U.S. and in 2005 also in Japan on JVC Victor.

As Allmusic point out in their review, with Khan's well-known affinity and acclaim for interpreting jazz standards in mind, which through most of her career on the Warner Bros. label had been relegated to the backburner, an album with the title ClassiKhan could at first glance very easily be mistaken for being a belated sequel to 1982's Echoes of an Era. While the album indeed does focus on jazz and swing standards like "Stormy Weather", "Hazel's Hips", "Round Midnight" and "Teach Me Tonight" it also features an eclectic selection of classics from other genres, like pop culture favourites such as Broadway show tune "Hey Big Spender" from the musical Sweet Charity, Peggy Lee's "Is That All There Is?" penned by Leiber & Stoller and even a 60's country and western classic in the form of Patsy Cline's "Crazy", written by Willie Nelson. ClassiKhan also features the themes of classic film favourites from Khan's youth, "To Sir With Love" and the James Bond themes "Goldfinger" and "Diamonds Are Forever". The collection concludes with one new composition, the ballad "I Believe", co-written by Khan and the album's producer Ira Shickman.

The title ClassiKhan is naturally also a reference to Khan's accompaniment on the set. On the Echoes of an Era album it was a five-piece all-star jazz ensemble, on ClassiKhan it is The New York All Star Musicians - but with the addition of the full London Symphony Orchestra, conducted and arranged by Eve Nelson and with orchestrations by producer Ira Schickman and Gary Anderson.

The album was mainly recorded at London's legendary Abbey Road Studios and it features guest appearances by among others pianist Joe Sample and percussionist Sheila E., best known for her work with Prince.

ClassiKhan was both a critical and commercial success, even reaching #42 on Billboard's R&B albums chart. As of 2005 it has sold 46,000 copies in United States according to Nielsen SoundScan.

Track listing 
 "Hey Big Spender" (Cy Coleman, Dorothy Fields) - 3:18 
 "Hazel's Hips" (Oscar Brown) - 2:59  
 "Best Is Yet to Come" (Carolyn Leigh, Cy Coleman) - 4:44
 "Crazy" (Willie Nelson) - 3:09 
 "I'm in the Mood for Love" (Dorothy Fields, Jimmy McHugh)  - 3:47
 "Is That All There Is?" (Jerry Leiber and Mike Stoller) - 3:58
 "Stormy Weather" (Harold Arlen, Ted Koehler) - 4:37
 "'Round Midnight" (Bernard Hanighen, Charles "Cootie" Williams, Thelonious Monk) - 4:30
 "Teach Me Tonight" (Gene de Paul, Sammy Cahn) - 4:11
 "To Sir with Love" (Donald Black, Mark London) - 4:23
 "Diamonds Are Forever" (Donald Black, John Barry) - 3:02
 "Goldfinger" (Anthony Newley, John Barry, Leslie Bricusse) - 3:08
 "I Believe" (Chaka Khan, Ira Schickman) - 3:34
 "To Sir with Love" (Barry Harris Club Mix) (Donald Black, Mark London) - 8:56
 Japanese bonus track

Personnel 
 Chaka Khan - vocals
 Andy Snitzer - clarinet, alto saxophone, tenor saxophone
 Charles Pillow - clarinet, oboe, alto saxophone
 Joe Sample - piano
 Eve Nelson - piano (track: 13)
 Sheila E. - percussion (tracks: 4, 6, 10 to 12)
 Jay Anderson - acoustic bass
 Ray Cervenka - bass (track: 10)
 Kevin Kuhn - acoustic guitar, electric guitar
 Dennis Mackrel - drums
 Lee Musiker - piano
 New York All Star Musicians - performers
 London Symphony Orchestra - orchestra
 Roger Rosenberg - bassoon, bass clarinet, baritone saxophone
 Timothy Ries - flute, tenor & alto saxophone
 Ann Elisworth - French horn
 Chris Komar - French horn
 John Clark Sr. - French horn
 Karen Vaughan - harp (principal)
 David Jackson - percussion (principal)
 Dennis Anderson - tenor saxophone, clarinet
 David Pietro - alto & tenor saxophone, flute
 Nigel Thomas - timpani (principal)
 M. Birch Johnson - trombone
 Michael Davis - trombone
 George - bass & tenor trombone
 Dave Stahl - trumpet
 James Hynes - trumpet
 Anthony Kadleck - trumpet
 Carmine Lauri - first violin, leader
 Caroline O-Neill - violin (first)
 Claire Parfitt - violin (first)
 Colin Renwick - violin (first)
 Ginette Decuyper - violin (first)
 Gordon McKay - violin (first)
 Harriet Rayfield - violin (first)
 Ian Rhodes - violin (first)
 Jorg Hammann - violin (first)
 Maxine Kwok - violin (first)
 Michael Humphrey - violin (first)
 Nicholas Wright - violin (first)
 Nicole Wilson - violin (first)
 Nigel Broadbent - violin (first)
 Robin Brightman - violin (first)
 Sylvain Vasseur - violin (first)
 Evgeny Grach - violin (second, principal) 
 Andrew Pollock - violin (second)
 Belinda McFarlane - violin (second)
 David Ballesteros - violin (second)
 Ian McDonough - violin (second)
 Louise Shackelton - violin (second)
 Matthew Gardner - violin (second)
 Norman Clarke - violin (second)
 Paul Robson - violin (second)
 Richard Blayden - violin (second)
 Sarah Quinn - violin (second)
 Stephen Rowlinson - violin (second)
 Tammy Se - violin (second)
 Tiberiu Buta  - violin (second)
 Paul Silvethorne - viola (principal)
 Gillianne Haddow - viola (co-principal)
 Duff Burns - viola
 Elisabeth Varlow - viola
 Gina Zagni - viola
 Jonathan Welch - viola
 Peter Norriss - viola
 Regina Beukes - viola
 Robert Turner - viola
 Moray Welsh - cello (principal)
 Rebecca Gilliver - cello (co-principal)
 Francis Saunders - cello
 Hilary Jones - cello
 Jennifer Brown - cello
 Nicholas Gethin - cello
 Noel Bradshaw - cello
 Ray Adams - cello

Producer 
 Eve Nelson - record producer, musical arranger, orchestral conductor
 Ira Schickman - writer producer (track: 13)
 Chaka Khan - additional production, executive producer
 Stu Ric - executive producer
 Tammy McCrary - executive producer
 Bernadette O'Reilly - Project Supervisor (Production Company) Nelson-O'Reilly Productions
 Ray Cervenka - additional production and Pro Tools editor (all tracks except:9 )
 Joe Sample - piano arrangement (tracks: 7 to 9)
 Arnold Mischkulnig - Pro Tools editor
 Andy Sntizer - Pro Tools editor (track: 9)
 Gary Anderson - musical arranger (track: 5), orchestrator (tracks: 4, 5, 10, 12), copyist, music preparation, New York All Star Musicians contractor, additional score preparation (tracks: 7 to 9)
 Shari Feder - orchestrator (tracks: 1 to 3, 6, 11)
 Alan Silverman - audio mastering
 Cynthia Daniels - audio mixing, recording
 Drew Griffiths - assistant engineer
 Raymond McKinley - assistant engineer
 Sam O'Kell - assistant engineer
 Recorded at Abbey Road Studios, London; Whitfield Street Studios, London; Clinton Recording, NYC and Blue 52 Studio.
 Mixed at Old Stone Studios.
 Additional editing at 22nd St. Street Studios.
 Mastered at ARFI Digital Studios, NYC, NY.
 Norman Scott - photography
 Giulio Costanzo - art direction, design

References 

Chaka Khan albums
2004 albums
Vocal jazz albums
Covers albums